William Arthur Knight (born 12 November 1935) is a former tennis player from Great Britain who competed on the amateur tour in the 1950s and 1960s.

Tennis career

Juniors
Before focusing on tennis Knight also played table tennis and won the English singles title in 1951. As a tennis junior he won both the 1953 Wimbledon and 1954 Australian Championships Boys' Singles tournaments.

Amateur tour
Knight's best slam performance was reaching the quarter-finals of the 1959 French Championships. He won the mixed doubles at the same tournament, partnering Yola Ramírez.

He won the singles title at the German Championships in Hamburg in 1959.

Knight was a frequent member of the British Davis Cup team between 1955 and 1964, reaching the Inter-Zonal group in 1963.

Grand Slam finals

Mixed doubles: 2 (1 title, 1 runner-up)

Junior Grand Slam titles

Singles: 2

References

External links
 
 

English male tennis players
French Championships (tennis) champions
Grand Slam (tennis) champions in mixed doubles
Wimbledon junior champions
Australian Championships (tennis) champions
British male tennis players
1935 births
Living people
Tennis people from Northamptonshire
Grand Slam (tennis) champions in boys' singles